Sagittario has been borne by at least three ships of the Italian Navy and may refer to:

 , a  launched in 1905 and discarded in 1923.
 , a  launched in 1936 and stricken in 1964.
 , a  launched in 1977. Sold to Peru in 2006 and renamed Quiñones. 

Italian Navy ship names